Lesbian, gay, bisexual, and transgender (LGBT) people in Uzbekistan face legal challenges not experienced by non-LGBT residents. Same-sex sexual activity between men is illegal in Uzbekistan. The punishment is up to three years in prison. Uzbekistan is one of just three post-Soviet states in which male homosexual activity remains criminalised, along with Turkmenistan and Chechnya.

Serious societal discrimination and abuse is directed towards LGBT persons, which includes mob violence, harassment, entrapment for the purpose of blackmail, and threats and use of violence. Despite the incidence of violence and intimidation, LGBT persons generally do not report these crimes to authorities for fear of further victimisation at their hands. There are reports of extortion by police, intimidation, arbitrary detention, assaults and other mistreatment of victims who have sought police assistance. Human rights violations by police also include torture, and severe beatings in detention. Vigilante attacks and mob violence, and other hate crimes, including murders, are targeted at LGBT individuals.
	
The Uzbek government has dismissed the need for action to protect sexual minorities, with one official declaring that even if same-sex sexual activities were decriminalised, LGBT persons could not be kept safe. Community attitudes that fuel such anti-LGBT activity stem from the Uzbek "mentality", with their "religion, culture, and traditions" making "gay men and women" unacceptable in the country, according to the spokesperson.

Legality of same-sex sexual activity
 	
Consensual same-sex sexual activity between men is criminalised by Article 120 of Uzbek's criminal code (1994), laws inherited from the Soviet era:

Morality laws
Article 130 covers the distribution of pornographic materials. This provision and was strengthened in 2012:

Summary table

See also

Human rights in Uzbekistan
LGBT rights in Asia

References

Uzbekistan
LGBT in Uzbekistan
Human rights in Uzbekistan
Law of Uzbekistan
LGBT rights in Uzbekistan